Raipur is a Lok Sabha parliamentary constituency in Chhattisgarh. The constituency consist of Raipur District and Baloda Bazar district. This Constituency is one of the important constituency in India.

Vidhan Sabha segments
Raipur Lok Sabha constituency is composed of the following assembly segments:

Members of Lok Sabha

Election results

2019 results

2014 results

2009 results

2004 results

1977 Election
 Purushottam Lal Kaushik (BLD) : 186,296 votes    
 Vidyacharan Shukla (INC) : 102,684

See also
 Raipur
 List of Constituencies of the Lok Sabha

References

Lok Sabha constituencies in Chhattisgarh
Raipur, Chhattisgarh